Events from the year 1738 in Sweden

Incumbents
 Monarch – Frederick I

Events

 6 June - Premier of the Den Afwundsiuke by Olof von Dalin at Bollhuset in Stockholm.   
  August - A treaty with France is made against the opposition of Arvid Horn. 
 - Arvid Horn steps down as President of the Privy Council Chancellery.
 - The first ballet with professional native Swedish ballet dancers is performed at Bollhuset in Stockholm.  
  - Premier of the Fru Rangsiuk by Reinhold Gustaf Modée at Bollhuset in Stockholm.  
 - Ichthyologia by Peter Artedi 
 - The Hats (party) and the Caps (party) is created.
 - The religious affair of Passionsspelen på Stora Bjurum
 - Samtal emellan Argi Skugga och en obekant Fruentimbers Skugga by Margareta Momma

Births

 
 June - Erika Liebman,  poet (died 1803) 
 22 July - Nils Henric Liljensparre, police officer  (died 1814)
 17 December - Fredrika Eleonora von Düben, painter and Embroidery artist  (died 1808)

 - Anna Sofia Ramström, courtier   (died 1786)

Deaths

 26 February - Burchardt Precht, furniture maker and sculptor  (born 1669)
 Gustaf von Psilander, admiral  (born 1669)
 
 
 Anna Catharina von Bärfelt, royal favorite (born 1673) 
 November 8 – Barbara Catharina Mjödh, poet (born 1776)

References

 
Years of the 18th century in Sweden
Sweden